"Classic (Better Than I've Ever Been)" is a song by American rappers Kanye West, Nas, and KRS-One. Produced by Rick Rubin and DJ Premier, it was released as a single on February 20, 2007 by Nike Records. It was performed live at the Nike Air Force Ones 25th anniversary party shown on MTV2.

Its remix, "Better Than I've Ever Been DJ Premier Remix", is produced by DJ Premier, and it features Rakim along with the aforementioned rappers. It features DJ Premier's signature scratches from prior songs such as Nas' "One Love" and "It Ain't Hard to Tell". The song was nominated for Best Rap Collaboration at the 50th Grammy Awards in 2008.

Proceeds from the song's sales go towards youth leadership programs through the Force4Change Fund.

The song is often misinterpreted as a DJ Premier track featuring Rakim, Nas and KRS-ONE and excluding Kanye West. This is due to a popular upload of the music video on YouTube where DJ Premier is credited as the artist and Kanye West's opening verse is removed from the video. The music video itself was released for the DJ Premier Remix of the song.

Track listing 

Side A: "Better Than I've Ever Been" (prod. Rick Rubin) featuring Kanye West, Nas, and KRS-One
– full song
– instrumental
– a cappella

Side B: "Classic (Better Than I've Ever Been DJ Premier Remix)" featuring Kanye West, Nas, KRS-One, and Rakim
– full song
– instrumental
– a cappella

Music video
The music video for the DJ Premier Remix of "Classic (Better Than I've Ever Been)" was released on March 29, 2007 and directed by Thibaut de Longeville.

Samples 
The original beat by Rick Rubin samples the song "Give Me the Night", performed by George Benson, off his Give Me the Night album.

DJ Premier's remix contains samples from "Dance the Kung-Fu" by Carl Douglas.

References

2007 singles
Rakim songs
Nas songs
Kanye West songs
KRS-One songs
Song recordings produced by DJ Premier
Songs written by Nas
2007 songs
Song recordings produced by Rick Rubin
Songs written by Biddu
Songs written by KRS-One
Songs written by Kanye West
Posse cuts